The Honorable Friend is a 1916 American drama silent film directed by Edward LeSaint and written by Elizabeth McGaffey and Eve Unsell. The film stars Sessue Hayakawa, Tsuru Aoki, Raymond Hatton, Goro Kino, M. Matsumato and William Elmer. The film was released on August 27, 1916, by Paramount Pictures.

Plot

Cast 
Sessue Hayakawa as Makino
Tsuru Aoki as Toki-Ye 
Raymond Hatton as Kayosho
Goro Kino as Goto
M. Matsumato as Hana 
William Elmer as Murphy

References

External links 
 

1916 films
1910s English-language films
Silent American drama films
1916 drama films
Paramount Pictures films
Films directed by Edward LeSaint
American black-and-white films
American silent feature films
1910s American films